Khunik-e Pain may refer to:
 Khunik-e Pain, Nehbandan
 Khunik-e Pain, Qaen